RNA-binding motif protein 7 is a protein that in humans is encoded by the RBM7 gene.

Interactions 

RBM7 has been shown to interact with SF3B2 and SFRS3.

References

Further reading 

 
 
 
 
 
 
  Rbm7 in epithelial cells plays a critical role in the development of fibrosis by regulating ncRNA decay and thereby the production of chemokines.

External links